Warburton is a town in Msukaligwa Local Municipality in the Mpumalanga province of South Africa.

References

Populated places in the Msukaligwa Local Municipality